Zhang Yanjun (born 7 February 1993) is a Chinese footballer who currently plays for Chinese club Hefei City.

Club career
Zhang Yanjun started his professional football career in 2012 when he was loaned to China League Two side Xinjiang Begonia from Liaoning F.C. He played at Liaoning's reserve team after his return and was eventually promoted to the first team squad in the 2017 season. On 2 May 2017, he made his senior debut for Liaoning in a 4–3 away defeat against Hangzhou Greentown in the 2017 Chinese FA Cup. He made his Chinese Super League debut on 20 May 2017 in a 2–0 away defeat against Hebei China Fortune, coming on as a substitute for Wang Liang in the 28th minute. He became a regular starter after his impressive performance in the match. On 24 June 2017, Zhang scored his first senior goal in a 2–1 away loss against Tianjin Quanjian. On 6 August 2017, Zhang collapsed in a league match against Guangzhou R&F at Yuexiushan Stadium where he collided with Ye Chugui. He was hospitalised and diagnosed as spinal shock.

Career statistics
.

References

External links
 

1993 births
Living people
Chinese footballers
Footballers from Shenyang
Liaoning F.C. players
Jiangxi Beidamen F.C. players
China League Two players
China League One players
Chinese Super League players
Association football midfielders